Nutter is an English occupational surname for either a keeper of oxen or a scribe or a clerk. Notable people with the surname include:

 Adam Nutter, English guitarist
 Alan Nutter (1920–1994), Australian football player
 Albert Nutter (1913–1996), English cricketer
 Alice Nutter (alleged witch) (died 1612), English woman hanged during the Pendle witch trials
 Alice Nutter (writer) (born 1962), British singer and percussionist
 Buzz Nutter (1931–2008),  American football player
 Christopher Lee Nutter (born 1970), American journalist and author
 Dave Nutter (born 1955), American politician from Virginia
 David Nutter (born 1960), American film director
 Dizzy Nutter (1893–1958), American baseball player
 Donald Grant Nutter (1915–1962), American politician
 Edna May Nutter (1883–1942), American actress
 Ezra Nutter (1858–1903), English cricketer
 G. Warren Nutter (1923–1979), American economist
 Geoffrey Nutter, American poet
 Gerry Nutter (born 1928), Australian diplomat
 Harold Nutter (1923–2017), Canadian Anglican bishop
 Harry Nutter (1901–1983), English footballer
 Janet Nutter (born 1953), Canadian diver
 John Nutter (born 1982), English footballer
 Michael Nutter (born 1957), American politician
 Rik Van Nutter (1929–2005), Dutch-American actor
 Robert Nutter ( 1550–1600), English Catholic priest
 Sarah Meriwether Nutter (1888–1950), American educator
 Tommy Nutter (1943–1992), Welsh fashion designer
 T. Gillis Nutter (1876– 1950), American attorney, businessman, and politician
 Zoe Dell Nutter (1915-2020), American aviator and model

See also 
 
 Nutter (disambiguation)

References 

English-language surnames
Occupational surnames
English-language occupational surnames